Vilnius municipality may refer to:

 Vilnius city municipality
 Vilnius district municipality